Edward George Fitzalan-Howard, 1st Baron Howard of Glossop PC (20 June 18181 December 1883), styled Lord Edward Howard between 1842 and 1869, was a British Liberal politician. He served as Vice-Chamberlain of the Household under Lord John Russell from 1846 to 1852.

Background and education
Howard was the second son of Henry Howard, 13th Duke of Norfolk and Lady Charlotte Sophia Leveson-Gower, daughter of George Leveson-Gower, 1st Duke of Sutherland. Henry Fitzalan-Howard, 14th Duke of Norfolk, was his elder brother. He was educated at Trinity College, Cambridge.

Political career
In 1846 Howard was sworn of the Privy Council and appointed Vice-Chamberlain of the Household in Lord John Russell's first administration, despite not having a seat in Parliament. Two years later he was returned to parliament for Horsham. He remained as Vice-Chamberlain of the Household until the fall of the Russell administration in 1852. The same year he was returned to parliament for Arundel, a seat he held until 1868. In 1869 he was raised to the peerage as Baron Howard of Glossop, in the County of Derby.

Lord Howard of Glossop was also Deputy Earl Marshal from 1860 to 1868 during the minority of his nephew Henry Fitzalan-Howard, 15th Duke of Norfolk.

Howard rendered great service to the cause of Roman Catholic primary education. From 1869 to 1877 he was chairman of the Catholic Poor Schools Committee. As chairman he set up the Catholic Education Crisis Fund, subscribing £5,000 to it himself, but securing another £20,000 from his family. Seventy thousand scholars were thus added to the Roman Catholic schools in England at a cost of at least £350,000.

Family
Lord Howard of Glossop married Augusta Talbot, daughter of George Henry Talbot (half-brother of John Talbot, 16th Earl of Shrewsbury), in 1851. They had two sons and five daughters:

Hon. Angela Mary Charlotte Fitzalan-Howard (died 1 March 1919), married Marmaduke Constable-Maxwell, 11th Lord Herries of Terregles, and was the mother of Gwendolen Fitzalan-Howard, Duchess of Norfolk.
Hon. Alice Elizabeth Fitzalan-Howard (died 10 May 1915), married Charles Rawdon-Hastings, 11th Earl of Loudoun.
Hon. Constance Mary Germana Fitzalan-Howard (died 30 January 1933), married Colonel Charles Lennox Tredcroft.
Hon. Winifrede Mary Fitzalan-Howard (died 26 January 1937), married William W. Middleton.
Charles Bernard Talbot Fitzalan-Howard (3 June 18528 July 1861).
Hon. Gwendolen Mary Anne Fitzalan-Howard (21 February 185415 January 1932), married John Crichton-Stuart, 3rd Marquess of Bute.
Francis Edward Fitzalan-Howard, 2nd Baron Howard of Glossop (9 May 18591924), father of Bernard Fitzalan-Howard, 3rd Baron Howard of Glossop.

Augusta died in July 1862. Lord Howard of Glossop married as his second wife Winifred Mary de Lisle, daughter of Ambrose Lisle March Phillipps de Lisle, in 1863. They had no children. He died in December 1883, aged 65, and was succeeded by his only surviving son, Francis who married Mary Littledale Greenwood, daughter of politician John Greenwood. Lady Howard of Glossop died in December 1909.

References

External links 
 
 

1818 births
1883 deaths
Barons in the Peerage of the United Kingdom
Barons Howard of Glossop
Edward Fitzalan-Howard, 01st Baron Howard of Glossop
Fitzalan-Howard, Edward George
Members of the Privy Council of the United Kingdom
Fitzalan-Howard, Edward
Fitzalan-Howard, Edward George
Fitzalan-Howard, Edward George
Fitzalan-Howard, Edward George
Fitzalan-Howard, Edward George
Fitzalan-Howard, Edward George
UK MPs who were granted peerages
Alumni of Trinity College, Cambridge
Peers of the United Kingdom created by Queen Victoria